The Losiolo Escarpment is an escarpment on the east side of the Great Rift Valley, Kenya.
The escarpment, which is also known as 'World's End', is the longest vertical drop in the Rift Valley.

References

Sources

Escarpments of Kenya
Great Rift Valley